The Magnetawan First Nation is an Ojibwe First Nation community in Ontario, Canada. The community is situated on reserve lands in Britt, Ontario.

Magnetawan Indian Reserve No. 1
Magnetawan No. 1 is a First Nation reserve 6 km east of Georgian Bay, south of Sudbury, Ontario, with an area of 47 km², occupied by the Magnetawan First Nation, an Ojibwe band. As of 2008/2009, its resident registered population is 233; 92 band members live on the reserve. Although the mother tongue is Ojibwe, English is the most commonly spoken.

References 

First Nations governments in Ontario
Ojibwe governments
Ojibwe reserves in Ontario
Anishinaabe reserves in Ontario
Communities in Parry Sound District
Ojibwe reserves and reservations
Magnetawan River